Boronia serrulata, commonly known as native rose or rose boronia, is a species of plant in the citrus family, Rutaceae, and is endemic to New South Wales, mainly in the Sydney basin. It is an erect, woody shrub with glabrous branchlets, simple, egg-shaped leaves with fine teeth on the edges, and bright pink, four-petalled flowers on the ends of the branchlets.

Description
Both sides of the leaf are the same colour and the edges have fine teeth. The eight stamens have a dense tuft of hairs near the tip. The style is hidden by a greatly enlarged stigma.

Taxonomy and naming
Boronia serrulata was first formally described in 1798 by James Edward Smith who published the description in his book ''Tracts relating to natural history. The specific epithet (serrulata) is derived from the diminutive form of the Latin word serra meaning "saw", referring to the fine teeth on the edge of the leaves.

Distribution and habitat
Native rose grows in sandy soil in moist heath, mainly in near-coastal parts of the Sydney basin.

Use in horticulture
This boronia is described as an attractive shrub with bright green leaves that are aromatic when crushed. It is most easily grown from semi-hardwood cuttings taken in early summer and the plant grows best in well-drained soil with a cool root run.

References 

serrulata
Flora of New South Wales
Plants described in 1798
Taxa named by James Edward Smith